Assumption College, is a NAAC accredited women's college in Kerala, India. It is affiliated with Mahatma Gandhi University. It is now an “Autonomous College”. It attained i's Autonomous status in the year 2016.  The college offers both bachelor's and master's degrees in a variety of subjects.

Notable alumni
 Geethu Anna Jose, Indian basketball player
 Meera Jasmine, Malayalam film actress
 Gayatri Arun, TV Actress

References

External links
 Website

Colleges affiliated to Mahatma Gandhi University, Kerala
Catholic universities and colleges in India
Arts and Science colleges in Kerala
Women's universities and colleges in Kerala
Universities and colleges in Kottayam